HD 37605 b is an extrasolar planet that is 2.84 times more massive than Jupiter. It orbits close to the star, taking 54 days to revolve around the parent star HD 37605. Its orbit is highly eccentric, around 74%. Distance from HD 37605 ranges from 0.069 to 0.453 astronomical units.

It is the first planet found by Hobby-Eberly Telescope (HET) in July 2004.

In a simulation, HD 37605 b's orbit "sweeps clean" most test particles within 0.5 AU; leaving only asteroids "in low-eccentricity orbits near the known planet’s apastron distance, near the 1:2 mean-motion resonance" with oscillating eccentricity up to 0.06, and also at 1:3 with oscillating eccentricity up to 0.4.

References

External links
 

Exoplanets discovered in 2004
Giant planets
Orion (constellation)
Exoplanets detected by radial velocity